Aleksandr Anatolyevich Pankovets (born 18 February 1990) is a former Russian professional footballer.

Club career
He made his professional debut in the Russian Football National League on 30 April 2007 for FC Sodovik Sterlitamak in a game against FC KAMAZ Naberezhnye Chelny. That was his only season in the FNL.

References

External links
 

1990 births
Living people
Russian footballers
Association football forwards
FC Sodovik Sterlitamak players
FC Lokomotiv Moscow players
FC Nosta Novotroitsk players